Stagira, Stagirus, or Stageira ( or ) was an ancient Greek city located near the eastern coast of the peninsula of Chalkidice, which is now part of the Greek province of Central Macedonia. It is chiefly known for being the birthplace of Aristotle, the Greek philosopher and polymath, student of Plato, and teacher of Alexander the Great.

Stagira was founded in 655 BC by Ionian settlers from Andros. Xerxes I of Persia occupied it in 480 BC. The city later joined the Delian League, led by Athens, but left in 424 BC: as a result, the Athenian demagogue Cleon laid siege to it in 422 BC. However, Cleon was a poor strategist and his conduct of the siege was very inefficient: so much so that the ancient Greek comedy writer Aristophanes satirised him in the play The Knights.  Cleon died in the same year, in the battle of Amphipolis. Later, during the Peloponnesian War, Stagira sided with Sparta against the Athenians.

In 348 BC, Philip II of Macedon occupied and destroyed the city. In return for Aristotle's tutoring of his son Alexander, Philip later rebuilt the city and resettled the old city's inhabitants. Many new structures were built at this time, including an aqueduct, two shrines to Demeter, and many houses.

Tradition has it that the natives of Stageira transferred Aristotle's relics to the city, buried it there, and founded a festival in his honour which was called “Aristoteleia”.

Notable people
 Aristotle, philosopher
 Hipparchus (Ἵππαρχος), philosopher, acquaintance and kin of Aristotle
 Nicomachus, father of Aristotle and doctor
 Arimneste, sister of Aristotle
 Nicomachus, son of Aristotle and philosopher
 Herpyllis, second wife of Aristotle and the mother of Nicomachus
 Nicanor of Stageira

See also
List of ancient Greek cities

References

Further reading 

 Daniel Vainstub, "A Phoenician Votive Inscription on a Figurine from Stageira and the Root ṬNʾ", in A. Lemaire (ed.), Phéniciens d'Orient et d'Occident. Mélanges Josette Elayi, Cahiers de l'Institut du Proche-Orient Ancien du Collège de France 2, Paris 2014, pp. 345-350

External links
 
 Official website
 Aristoteles-Park in Stagira

655 BC
Andrian colonies
Greek colonies in Chalcidice
Former populated places in Greece
7th-century BC establishments